Hossein Amanat (born 1942) is an Iranian-Canadian architect.  He is best known for being the architect of the Shahyad Tower (renamed as Azadi Tower after the 1979 revolution) in Tehran, Iran, the Baháʼí Arc buildings in Haifa, Israel and the House of Worship in Samoa. He has also been designated as the architect of the future Shrine of ʻAbdu'l-Bahá.

Practice 

As a young graduate from the University of Tehran he won a nationwide competition in 1966 to design the Shahyad Tower, renamed the Azadi Tower in 1979.  This first architectural project led to the opportunity to create some of Iran's most distinctive projects with reference to traditional Persian architecture. Amongst them are the initial buildings of the Sharif University of Technology in Tehran, Iran., the Persian Heritage Center, the Faculty for Business Management of the Tehran University and the Embassy of Iran in Beijing, China. As a member of the persecuted Baháʼí Faith, Amanat fled the country during the 1979 Iranian Revolution.  He is the brother of Abbas Amanat, Professor of History & International Studies at Yale University.

Since moving to Canada in 1980, Hossein Amanat designed the three administrative buildings on the Baháʼí Arc in Haifa, Israel, the Baháʼí House of Worship in Samoa, the Jiang'an Library for the Sichuan University, the media library for the Beijing Broadcasting Institute. He designed religious and cultural centers for the Baháʼí Faith near Dallas, Texas, Seattle and Washington, D.C., several multifamily condominiums in Santa Monica, California, and mixed-use high-rise buildings in San Diego, California and Burnaby, British Columbia, Canada.

On 7 May 2019 the Universal House of Justice announced Amanat as the architect of the future Shrine of ʻAbdu'l-Bahá.

Awards 
2001 American Concrete Institute Award
1995 Excellence in Building Design, Marble from Greece Competition
1985 Tucker Award for Architectural Excellence
1975 Royal Pahlavi Medal for Design
1971 Medal of Art - Iranian Ministry of Education

See also 
 List of historical Iranian architects

References

External links 

 Amanat Architect
  BBC interview with Hossein Amanat, October 2007
 A list of Canadian Baháʼís in the news
 BBC interview: The man behind Tehran's Freedom Monument July 2009

1942 births
Canadian Bahá'ís
Canadian architects
Iranian Bahá'ís
Iranian emigrants to Canada
Iranian architects
Living people
University of Tehran alumni
Alborz High School alumni
20th-century Bahá'ís
21st-century Bahá'ís
Exiles of the Iranian Revolution in Canada